Mary Marechal was a female Belgian tennis player who has represented Belgium in the Federation Cup in 1963, and also played in Wimbledon.
She also represented Belgium in hockey in the 1960 World Cup. She is wife to Christopher Penn, mother to 4 (Erica, Sophie, Bella and Victoria) and grandmother to 12 (Benjamin, Oliver, Rebecca, Natalie, Sally, Patrick, Emily, Thomas, Elizabeth, William, Samuel and Phoebe).

References

Belgian female tennis players
Year of birth missing (living people)
Living people